Marisa Paterson (born 1982) is an Australian anthropologist, academic and politician. She was elected to the Australian Capital Territory Legislative Assembly in 2020, representing the Australian Labor Party.

Education
Paterson graduated from Monash University with a Bachelor of Arts in anthropology and psychology. She completed a Masters of Applied Anthropology and Participatory Development at the Australian National University. She graduated with a Doctor of Philosophy in anthropology from Charles Darwin University for her thesis, "From card games to poker machines: gambling in remote Aboriginal communities in the Northern Territory".

Career
Paterson worked at the Auckland University of Technology for some time, before 2017. On 25 August 2022, Paterson and the Auckland University of Technology announced an agreed position on her complaint of sexual harassment, stalking, and bullying while working there.

As director of the Centre for Gambling Research at the Australian National University, Paterson's focus has been on modelling the impact of gambling on Indigenous communities.

At the 2020 Australian Capital Territory general election, Paterson won one of the five seats in Murrumbidgee. Paterson was the only new Labor member elected at the 2020 election.

Selected publications

References

1982 births
Living people
21st-century Australian politicians
Australian anthropologists
Australian women anthropologists
Australian Labor Party members of the Australian Capital Territory Legislative Assembly
Australian National University alumni
Academic staff of the Australian National University
Charles Darwin University alumni
Members of the Australian Capital Territory Legislative Assembly
Monash University alumni
Women members of the Australian Capital Territory Legislative Assembly
21st-century Australian women politicians